The Lithuania Billie Jean King Cup team represents Lithuania in the Billie Jean King Cup tennis competition and are governed by the Lithuanian Tennis Association.

In 2016-2017, Lithuania played in Group II of Europe/Africa zone, but dropped to Group III in 2018.

Team 

Current team (2019)
Joana Eidukonytė
Iveta Daujotaitė
Klaudija Bubelytė

Team (2018)
Joana Eidukonytė
Iveta Daujotaitė
Paulina Bakaitė
Gerda Zykutė

Team (2017)
Joana Eidukonytė
Paulina Bakaitė
Gerda Zykutė
Gabija Druteikaitė

Team (2016)
Iveta Daujotaitė
Paulina Bakaitė
Gerda Zykutė

Results

2016 - 2018

History
Lithuania competed in its first Fed Cup in 1992. Their best result was appearing in Group I on five occasions.

In 2009–2010 Lithuania did not participate in Fed Cup tennis competition. They came back to the third group of Fed Cup in 2011 and stayed in the same group for 2012. In 2012 Lithuania won the play-off tie against Morocco and got promoted to the second group for the following year.

Lithuanian players represented the Soviet Union prior to 1992.

See also
Fed Cup
Lithuania Davis Cup team

External links

Billie Jean King Cup teams
Fed Cup
Fed Cup
1992 establishments in Lithuania